Jakub Šindel is a Czech former ice hockey center. During his career, which lasted from 2003 to 2016, he played for several teams in different European leagues. He was also selected by the Chicago Blackhawks of the National Hockey League in the 2nd round (54th overall) of the 2004 NHL Entry Draft. After his playing career he became a referee.

His father Jaromír Šindel was also an international in the sport.

Career statistics

Regular season and playoffs

International

References

External links
 

1986 births
Living people
Ässät players
BK Mladá Boleslav players
Brandon Wheat Kings players
Chicago Blackhawks draft picks
Coventry Blaze players
Czech ice hockey centres
Dinamo Riga players
EHC Kloten players
HC Dukla Jihlava players
HC Kometa Brno players
HC Morzine-Avoriaz players
HC Plzeň players
HC Sparta Praha players
Lahti Pelicans players
Oulun Kärpät players
SHC Fassa players
SK Horácká Slavia Třebíč players
Sportspeople from Jihlava
SV Kaltern players
Czech ice hockey officials
Czech expatriate ice hockey players in Canada
Czech expatriate ice hockey players in Finland
Czech expatriate ice hockey players in Switzerland
Czech expatriate sportspeople in Latvia
Czech expatriate sportspeople in Italy
Czech expatriate sportspeople in England
Czech expatriate sportspeople in France
Expatriate ice hockey players in Latvia
Expatriate ice hockey players in England
Expatriate ice hockey players in Italy
Expatriate ice hockey players in France